I Don't Care is an album by Buck Owens and his Buckaroos, released in 1964. It reached Number one on the Billboard Country charts and Number 135 on the Pop Albums charts. The single "I Don't Care" spent six weeks at number one.

The album features a duet with Rose Maddox as well as lead vocals by Don Rich and Doyle Holly. It was re-released on CD in 1995 by Sundazed Records with two bonus tracks, both instrumentals from The Buck Owens Songbook.

Reception

In his Allmusic review, critic Cub Koda wrote "Like his previous albums, this one features solo performances from Owens... mixed with solo turns by the rest of the band."

Track listing

Side one
 "I Don't Care (Just as Long as You Love Me)" (Buck Owens) – 2:10
 "Dang Me" (Roger Miller) – 2:01
 "Don't Let Her Know" (Owens, Bonnie Owens, Don Rich) – 2:35
 "Buck's Polka" (Owens) – 1:55
 "Understand Your Man" (Johnny Cash) – 2:50
 "Loose Talk" (Freddie Hart, Ann Lucas) – 2:34

Side two
 "You're Welcome Anytime" (Buddy Mize, Ray Sanders) – 2:28
 "Abilene" (John D. Loudermilk) – 2:48
 "Playboy" (Eddie Miller, Bob Morris) – 1:56
 "Bud's Bounce" (Bud Isaacs) – 1:48
 "Louisiana Man" (Doug Kershaw) – 2:49
 "This Ol' Heart" (Eddie Miller, Bob Morris) – 2:07
1995 bonus tracks:
 "I Don't Care (Just as Long as You Love Me)" (Owens) – 2:09
 "Don't Let Her Know" (Owens, Owens, Rich) – 2:38

Personnel
Buck Owens – guitar, vocals
Don Rich – guitar, fiddle, vocals, (lead vocal on "Dang Me" and "Louisiana Man")
Doyle Holly – bass, vocals (lead vocal on "Abilene" and "Understand Your Man")
Rose Maddox – vocal duet on "Loose Talk"
Tom Brumley – pedal steel guitar
Willie Cantu – drums
Pee Wee Adams – drums
Bob Morris – bass
Jay McDonald – pedal steel guitar
Mel King – drums
George French – piano
Jim Pierce – piano
Jelly Sanders – fiddle, guitar
Allen Williams – bass

References

1964 albums
Buck Owens albums
Capitol Records albums
Albums produced by Ken Nelson (United States record producer)

Albums recorded at Capitol Studios